Domny is a village in Novoderevenkovsky District of Oryol Oblast, Russia.

References

Rural localities in Oryol Oblast